Al Klink (December 28, 1915 in Danbury, Connecticut – March 7, 1991 in Bradenton, Florida) was an American swing jazz tenor saxophonist.

Career
Klink played with Glenn Miller from 1939 to 1942, and is a featured soloist, along with Tex Beneke, on the most well-known version of "In the Mood". When Miller started playing in the U.S. military, Klink played with Benny Goodman and Tommy Dorsey, and did work as a session musician after World War II ended. Klink appeared in the 1941 film Sun Valley Serenade and 1942 film Orchestra Wives.

From 1952 to 1953 he played with the Sauter-Finegan Orchestra. In 1955, he recorded his only session as a bandleader, performing six songs for a Bob Alexander album that won a Grammy Award. In the late-1960s to early-1970s, he was a tenor saxophone doubler on the staff of NBC's Tonight Show Band under Doc Severinsen, where he was an occasional featured soloist. After a hiatus, he returned in 1974 when he began playing with the World's Greatest Jazz Band. In the 1970s, he played with Glenn Zottola and George Masso, and continued playing until the mid-1980s, when he retired to Florida.

Death 
Klink died in Bradenton, Florida in 1991.

Discography
 Satan in High Heels (1961)
 Ping Pong Percussion (1961)
 Swing into Spring (1958)

With Mundell Lowe
 Guitar Moods (Riverside, 1956)
 Progressive Jazz (1956)
 Satan in High Heels (soundtrack) (Charlie Parker, 1961)
With Gerry Mulligan
 Holliday with Mulligan (DRG, 1961 [1980]) with Judy Holliday
With Nelson Riddle
 Phil Silvers and Swinging Brass (Columbia, 1957)With' Cootie WilliamsCootie Williams in Hi-Fi (RCA Victor, 1958)Porgy & Bess Revisited'' (Warner Bros., 1959) with Rex Stewart

References
Footnotes

General references
Scott Yanow, [ Al Klink] at AllMusic

External links
 Al Klink recordings at the Discography of American Historical Recordings

1991 deaths
1915 births
Musicians from Connecticut
American session musicians
American male saxophonists
20th-century American saxophonists
20th-century American male musicians
Glenn Miller Orchestra members
The Tonight Show Band members